Poliosia binotata is a moth in the family Erebidae. It was described by George Hampson in 1893. It is found in Sri Lanka.

Description
In the female, the head, thorax and abdomen are pale fuscous. Anal tufts are ochreous. Forewings pale fuscous irrorated (sprinkled) with brown scales. A dark spot is found at end of the cell and another spot below vein 2. Hindwings are much paler.

References

Moths described in 1893
Lithosiina